Xiandai Wenxue (Chinese: 現代文學; literally "Modern Literature") was a Taiwanese literary journal created in 1960. The journal was published on a bimonthly basis.

The journal was the brainchild of several National Taiwan University students, including Ouyang Tzu and Pai Hsien-yung. The journal published the literary debuts of several prominent Taiwanese writers, and emulated the modernist style that was becoming fashionable in Taiwanese literature during the late-1950s and 1960s. In 1973 the journal ended publication.

References

Leo Ou-fan Lee. Shanghai Modern: The Flowering of a New Urban Culture in China, 1930-1945. Harvard University Press, 1999 p. 366

1960 establishments in Taiwan
1973 disestablishments in Taiwan
Bi-monthly magazines
Chinese literature
Chinese-language magazines
Defunct magazines published in Taiwan
Defunct literary magazines
Magazines established in 1960
Magazines disestablished in 1973
Mass media in Taipei
Xindai wenxue
Magazines published in Taiwan